This is a list of notable museums, exhibitions, and in galleries Bangkok.

Defunct museums
 Children's Discovery Museum
 Bangkok Fashion Trend Center

See also
 List of districts of Bangkok
 List of museums in Thailand

References

Museums of Bangkok

 
Bangkok
Museums
Museums